The Billund railway line  was a planned railway line of 19 km to connect the existing Danish rail network at Jelling to Billund Airport and Billund itself to cater to the Legoland resort there.

Background
In 2014 planning of the line was agreed, with a projected cost of 734 million DKK. The planned opening of the line was estimated to be 2020. However, in 2021, the Danish government cancelled the project.

References

Proposed railway lines in Denmark